On May 1, 1826, Alexander Thomson (J) of  resigned.  A special election was held to fill the resulting vacancy on October 10, 1826, the same day as the general elections to the 20th Congress.

Election results

Forward took his seat on December 4, 1826, at the start of the Second Session of Congress.

See also
List of special elections to the United States House of Representatives

References

Pennsylvania 1826 13
Pennsylvania 1826 13
1826 13
Pennsylvania 13
United States House of Representatives 13
United States House of Representatives 1826 13
October 1826 events